Where Are You Going, Alfonso XII? is a 1959 Spanish historical drama film directed by Luis César Amadori and starring Paquita Rico and Vicente Parra. It portrays the life of Alfonso XII of Spain and Maria de las Mercedes. It was followed by a sequel Alfonso XII and María Cristina the following year.

Cast
 Paquita Rico as Maria de las Mercedes
 Vicente Parra as Alfonso XII
 Tomás Blanco as Duque de Sesto
 José Marco Davó as Antonio Cánovas del Castillo
 Lucía Prado as Infanta Isabel
 Mercedes Vecino as Isabel II
 Félix Dafauce as Duque de Montpensier 
 Ana María Custodio as Duquesa de Montpensier
 Jesús Tordesillas as Ceferino
 Mariano Azaña as Gobernador
 Aurora García Alonso as Clotilde
 Antonio Riquelme as Madrileño
 Rafael Bardem as Doctor Federico Rubio y Galí
 Isabel Pallarés
 María Luisa Ponte
 Luisa María Payán as María Cristina de Orleans
 Alfonso Rojas 
 José Santamaría  
 Aníbal Vela
 Nora Samsó
 Carmen Rodríguez 
 Manuel Arbó
 Erasmo Pascual
 Xan das Bolas as Madrileño
 Ángel Álvarez as Tabernero

Reception
The film was the leader at the Spanish box office in 1959.

References

Bibliography 
 Mira, Alberto. Historical Dictionary of Spanish Cinema. Scarecrow Press, 2010.

External links 
 

1959 films
1950s historical drama films
Spanish historical drama films
1950s Spanish-language films
Films directed by Luis César Amadori
Films set in the 19th century
Alfonso XII of Spain
1959 drama films
Cultural depictions of Isabella II of Spain
1950s Spanish films